The V 52 was a one off, single engine, two seat sports monoplane, built in Germany in 1925.

Design and development

Whilst the other LFG two seat monoplane sports aircraft (the V 40, V 42 and V 44) produced in 1925 were all metal designs, the V 52 employed wooden construction.  It also differed from them in having a braced, rather than wholly cantilever wing.  This was built around wooden box spares, with three ply ribs and fabric covering.  The fuselage was also wooden, with three ply covering.

Like the V 40, the V 52 was powered by a  Siemens-Halske Sh 11 7-cylinder radial engine.

Operational history
The V 52 was amongst five LFG entries to the Round Germany Flight held in the summer of 1925, though only the LFG V 39 biplane took take part, with all four monoplanes failing to make the start.

Specifications

References

1920s German sport aircraft
LFG V 52
Single-engined tractor aircraft
Aircraft first flown in 1925